Lee Choon-hee (born 6 December 1955) is the mayor of Sejong City, South Korea. Previously, during the presidency of Roh Moo-Hyun, he was Vice Minister of the Ministry of Land, Infrastructure and Transport. He later moved on to become the first administrator of the National Agency for Administrative City Construction that oversaw the planning and construction of Sejong City. In his second attempt, he won the election and became Mayor of Sejong City in 2014. He won the 2018 Mayoral election with 71.3% of the votes to serve his second term as Mayor of Sejong City. Back in 1986-87 when he was with the Ministry of Construction, he attended a one-year non-degree Special Program in Urban Studies (SPURS) at the Department of Urban Studies and Planning (DUSP), Massachusetts Institute of Technology (MIT).

References

1955 births
Living people
Mayors of places in South Korea
Government ministers of South Korea
Minjoo Party of Korea politicians